"Tan Feliz" (English: So Happy) is a song by American artist Pee Wee. The first version of the song was released on September 6, 2009, as a second promotional single from his debut studio album Yo Soy. The song was covered by Pee Wee featuring Brazilian pop singer Kelly Key from his second studio album, Déjate Querer, on February 4, 2011.

Music video
A short music video was made exclusively for telenovela Camaleones in Colegio San Bartolomé that appears on the story, Sherlyn (Solange) and Ferdinando Valencia (Patricio) also appears on the video.

Single version 

"Tan Feliz" is a song by American artist Pee Wee release on February 4, 2011. The song, featuring Brazilian pop singer Kelly Key, was written by Pee Wee, Francisco Saldaña, Norgie Noriega and Víctor Delgado from her second studio album, Déjate Querer.

Background
On February 25, 2010, Kelly announced the negotiations with Pee Wee's agents for a featuring in her album. On April 13, the singer said on Twitter that she would record the song. On September 9, Kelly said he would embark for Mexico to record the song, a new version of Tan Feliz. The song will be released on January, 2011.

Music video
The music video would be filmed on December, 2010 in Miami, but was canceled.

References

External links
Pee Wee official website
"Tan Feliz" Music Video at YouTube

2009 singles
Pee Wee (singer) songs
Songs written by Pee Wee (singer)
Pop ballads
Songs written by Noriega (producer)
Song recordings produced by Luny Tunes
Songs written by Francisco Saldaña
2009 songs
Interscope Records singles